William James Clarke (1871– 22 October 1945) was a natural history collector and folklorist from Scarborough, Yorkshire. He served as the curator of the Scarborough museum around 1906. He also dealt in natural history specimens and ran a fishing tackle and taxidermy store.

Clarke was born in Scarborough where his father Richard ran Clarke's Aerated Waters and Bottling Company. He went to Miss Mary Graham's nursery and Mr Wheater's grammar school. He became interested in natural history after a meeting with George Massee, joining the latters naturalists' club at the Unitarian Church in 1880. He then studied at Frederick York Richmond's school where Clarke set up an aquarium and museum. At the age of 12 he gave a talk on reptiles at the Grand Hotel to raise funds for the Union Jack Field Club of the school. He later joined the Scarborough Field Naturalists Society, presiding over it in 1894. He apprenticed at a printing press and later started a store dealing with natural history specimens on 44 Huntriss Row. Apart from natural history, he also took an interest in charms and amulets and began to collect them.  He was a curator at the Rotunda Museum from 1913 to 1915 and gave away his collections to the museum after his death. Clarke found a giant squid which was found on the beach on 14 January 1933 which was described as a new species Architeuthis clarkei by G. C. Robson although that name is now treated as a synonym.

References

External links 
 Who was William James Clarke?

1871 births
1945 deaths
Natural history collectors